Lohorung may be:
Lohorung people
Lohorung language